Jönssonligan och Dynamit-Harry (1982) (The Johnson Gang & Dynamite-Harry - International: English title) is a Swedish film about the gang Jönssonligan, based on the Danish film The Olsen Gang Goes Crazy.

This is the second film in the series, and the first to feature Dynamit-Harry, who would replace Rocky in all the following films in the series.

Cast
Gösta Ekman - Charles-Ingvar "Sickan" Jönsson
Ulf Brunnberg - Ragnar Vanheden
Nils Brandt - Rocky
Björn Gustafson - Dynamit-Harry
Carl Billquist - Persson
Dan Ekborg - Gren
Sten Ardenstam - Appelgren
Mona Seilitz - Katrin Appelgren
Weiron Holmberg - Biffen
Jarl Borssén - Night guard
Lena Söderblom - Mrs. Lundberg
Per Grundén - Wall-Enberg
Peder Ivarsson - Bill
Peter Harryson - Polis
Jan Waldekranz - Polis
Gösta Krantz - Driver

External links 

Swedish comedy films
Jönssonligan films
1982 films
Films directed by Mikael Ekman
1980s Swedish films